The 1941–42 Santosh Trophy was the first edition of the Santosh Trophy, the main state competition for football in India. It was held in July, 1941. Bengal won the title beating Delhi 5-1 in the final.

Ten teams entered the tournament but Dacca Sporting Association withdrew.  Matches were played across the country, though the final was played in Calcutta.

Preliminary matches

Zone A
 NWIFA (Punjab and Balochistan) qualified directly for the semifinals as they were only team in the North Zone.

Zone B

Zone C

 Bengal received a walkover as Dacca withdrew drew to communal riots. The match was scheduled to be held in Dacca on 13 July.

Zone D

The score was 1-1 at half-time.

Semifinals

Final
There was a shower before the final and both teams started cautiously. The gates for the match was 6175 rupees and 4 annas (Rs. 6175.25). The Bengal-Bombay semifinal at the same venue collected 6492 rupees and 8 annas.

De Mello scored the first goal in the fourth minute directly from a corner kick, an "Olympic Goal". "The ball came in the trek of an archaic parabola and swerved into the net within the far post." Hameeduddin equalised in the ninth minute with a rising shot, from a pass by Atma Ram. In the 22nd minute, the Delhi goal keeper Daley missed by a center by Noor Mohammad. The ball was headed on by D. Banerjee for De Mello to score his second goal. Bengal led 2-1 at half time.

The third Bengal goal came in the eighth minute of the second half, Banerjee playing an angular shot from the right across Daley from a pass by Bhattacharjee. Bhattacharjee scored in the 16th and 23rd minutes, Sunil Ghosh providing both assists. Ghosh suffered a head injury at the start of the match but returned in the eleventh minute.

Bengal was presented the trophy by Mrs H.R. Norton, the wife of the President of Indian Football Association. The chief guests for the final were Mrs Norton and B. C. Ghosh, the vice president of the IFA.

Squads
 Bombay : F. E.Edden (captain, Bombay Gymkhana); James (British Infantry) and S. Thompson (H.V.M.); Raja (B.E.S.T), Alexander (Y.M.C.A) and Telang (B.E.S.T); Bhimrao (Y.M.C.A), Rashad (Muslim Sports), Hill (British Infantry), Butchi (B.E.S.T) and Langton (British Infantry). Reserves : Drynan (GK, Heavy Battery), Higgins (Heavy Battery), Osbourne (Police), Karunakar (Caltex) and Swami (W.I.A.A) 
 Mysore : Kadirvelu; Habeeb and Atkinson; Sheriff, Khader and Chinnaswamy; Nanjunda, Laxminarayan, Swaminathan, Murgesh and Rahmat 
 Delhi : Daley; Kaul, Qamaruddin, Yousuf, Afzal and Sardar Mirza; Habeed, Nawab, Akhtar, Atma Ram and Fayaz Khan
 Rajputana : N Lodrick; H. Dean, A Rahim; Mobeen Ahmad, Sajjad Mohammad, Samiullah; Mumtaz Ahmed, Atta Mohammad, Debi Singh, Wahiduddin and Sikandar Khan

Notes
Some of the teams are referred to after their football associations. This article uses the names by which the teams came to be known.

 IFA Bengal (Indian Football Association) - Bengal
 WIFA Bombay (Western India Football Association) - Bombay
 NWIFA (North West India Football Association) - Punjab and Balochistan
 Delhi FA - Delhi

References

Santosh Trophy seasons
1941–42 in Indian football